

The Hurricane-La Verkin Bridge spans the Virgin River, connecting the towns of Hurricane and LaVerkin in southern Utah, United States.

Description
The five-panel steel Warren pony truss spans , and is supported by concrete-filled steel cylinder piers. It is one of the oldest Warren pony truss bridges in Utah, built in 1908 by the Midland Bridge Company.

The Hurricane-LaVerkin Bridge was placed on the National Register of Historic Places on April 14, 1995.

See also

List of bridges documented by the Historic American Engineering Record in Utah
List of bridges on the National Register of Historic Places in Utah
National Register of Historic Places listings in Washington County, Utah

References

External links

Road bridges on the National Register of Historic Places in Utah
Bridges completed in 1908
Buildings and structures in Washington County, Utah
Historic American Engineering Record in Utah
Transportation in Washington County, Utah
National Register of Historic Places in Washington County, Utah
1908 establishments in Utah
Steel bridges in the United States
Warren truss bridges in the United States